Mount Tabor, is a mountain  east of Prince George, British Columbia, Canada adjacent to BC Highway 16.

As such, it has become the site of the small Tabor Mountain Ski Resort, which is one of Prince George's two local ski hills, the other being the small Hart Highlands Alpine Park on the north side of the city. East of the Willow River and just beyond the Bowron River, forty kilometres farther east, is Mount Purden, the site of Purden Ski Village and which is the northernmost summit of the Cariboo Mountains.

References

External links
Tabor Mountain Ski Resort homepage
britishcolumbia.com "Ski Resorts in Prince George" webpage

Tabor
Cariboo Land District